Nyctimystes sauroni  is a species of tree frog in the subfamily Pelodryadinae.  It is endemic to Papua New Guinea.  Scientists know it solely from the Kikori Integrate Conservation and Development Project area.

Taxonomy
The species epithet sauroni refers to the red and black mottled eye of The Lord of the Rings character Sauron. Scientists currently  disagree about whether this frog is best placed in the genus Litoria or Nyctimystes.

Description
This frog has red-and-black eyes and nuptial pads on its front feet.

References

Species described in 2006
sauroni
Organisms named after Tolkien and his works